The Mitre Corporation (stylized as The MITRE Corporation and MITRE) is an American not-for-profit organization with dual headquarters in Bedford, Massachusetts, and McLean, Virginia. It manages federally funded research and development centers (FFRDCs) supporting various U.S. government agencies in the aviation, defense, healthcare, homeland security, and cybersecurity fields, among others.

History

MITRE was founded in Bedford, Massachusetts in 1958, spun off from the MIT Lincoln Laboratory. MITRE's first employees had been evaluating the Semi-Automatic Ground Environment (SAGE) system and aerospace defense as part of Lincoln Labs Division 6. MITRE's early leadership has been described as "a mix of men" affiliated with the Ford Foundation, the Institute for Defense Analyses, RAND Corporation, System Development Corporation (SDC), and the United States Armed Forces, including Horace Rowan Gaither, James Rhyne Killian, James McCormack, and Julius Adams Stratton.

In April 1959, a site was purchased in Bedford, Massachusetts, near Hanscom Air Force Base, to develop a new Mitre laboratory, which Mitre occupied in September 1959. MITRE established an office in McLean in 1963, and had approximately 850 technical employees by 1967. MITRE registered the first .org domain on July 10, 1985, which continues to be used by the company. During the 1980s, the German hacker Markus Hess used an unsecured Mitre Tymnet connection as an entry point for intrusions into U.S. Department of Defense, Department of Energy, and NASA computer networks. By 1989, the company had thousands of employees in Bedford and McLean; approximately 3,000 employees in the "command, control, communications and intelligence" ("C3I") division oversaw military projects, while non-military projects were handled by the civilian division, which had approximately 800 employees based in McLean.

By the 1990s, MITRE had become a "multifaceted engineering company with a wide range of clients", according to Kathleen Day of The Washington Post. MITRE worked on neural network software, the long-distance telecommunications service FTS2000 for the General Services Administration, and a new computer system for the U.S. Securities and Exchange Commission. On January 29, 1996, Mitre divided into two entities: The MITRE Corporation, to focus on its FFRDCs for DoD and FAA; and a new company established in McLean, called Mitretek Systems until 2007 and now called Noblis, to assume non-FFRDC research work for other U.S. Government agencies.

Organization
MITRE restructured research and development operations in mid 2020, forming MITRE Labs. Approximately half of MITRE's employees work under the unit, which seeks to "further extend the parent organization's impact across federally-funded research-and-development centers and with partners in academia and industry".

The nonprofit foundation MITRE Engenuity (or simply Engenuity) was launched in 2019 "to collaborate with the private sector on solving industrywide problems with cyber defense" in collaboration with corporate partners. The foundation created the Center for Threat-Informed Defense that has 23 member organizations with cybersecurity teams, as of 2020, including Fujitsu and Microsoft. In September 2020, Engenuity's Center for Threat-Informed Defense and partners launched the Adversary Emulation Library, a GitHub-hosted project providing downloadable emulation plans to network security groups at no cost. The library's first plan was focused on the prominent cybercrime group FIN6. MITRE had previously released emulation plans for the Chinese and Russian hacker groups Advanced Persistent Threat (APT) 3 and APT29 in 2017 and 2020, respectively. In March 2021, Engenuity created the MITRE ATT&CK Defender training program to educate and certify cybersecurity professionals.

Federally funded research and development centers (FFRDCs) 
MITRE manages six FFRDCs. The National Security Engineering Center, previously known as the C3I Federally Funded Research and Development Center until 2011, addresses national security issues for the Department of Defense.

MITRE's Center for Advanced Aviation System Development (CAASD) supports the FAA, an agency within the Department of Transportation.

The organization's Center for Enterprise Modernization, which focuses on enterprise modernization, was established as the IRS Federally Funded Research and Development Center in 1998, before being renamed in August 2001. Originally sponsored by the Internal Revenue Service (a bureau of the Department of the Treasury), the Department of Veterans Affairs joined as a co-sponsor in 2008, and the Social Security Administration joined as a co-sponsor in 2018.

MITRE's Homeland Security Systems Engineering and Development Institute (HSSEDI) completes work for the Department of Homeland Security, such as maintaining the federal executive department's list of the 25 most common software bugs. The HSSEDI was established in 2009, following passage of the Homeland Security Act of 2002, and along with the Homeland Security Studies and Analysis Institute replaced the Homeland Security Institute.

MITRE's CMS Alliance to Modernize Healthcare was established in 2012 as the Centers for Medicare and Medicaid Services Federally Funded Research and Development Center, also known as the Health FFRDC. The FFRDC is sponsored by the Centers for Medicare & Medicaid Services, an agency within the Department of Health and Human Services.

MITRE has managed the National Cybersecurity FFRDC since 2014, following receipt of a "single indefinite-delivery, indefinite-quantity" $5 million contract from the National Institute of Science and Technology (NIST) for a research center dedicated to cybersecurity. MITRE will support NIST's work "related to cybersecurity solutions composed of commercial components and the integration of technology to build trustworthy information systems for government agencies".

Currently, MITRE holds the contract to administer and provide management to JASON, an advisory group for the federal government made up of scientists.

Policy 
MITRE's Center for Data-Driven Policy, established in 2020, seeks to "provide evidence-based, objective and nonpartisan insights for government policymaking".

The Center for Technology & National Security, now part of the Center for Data-Driven Policy, was created to link MITRE "with senior government officials for research and development purposes". Members of the advisory board include John F. Campbell, Lisa Disbrow, William E. Gortney, Robert B. Murrett, and Robert O. Work, as of mid 2020.

Projects

National security 
U.S. military forces, especially the Air Force, were primary initial sponsors; according to Air Force Magazine, MITRE was created "as a special-purpose technical not-for-profit firm to perform the SAGE systems-engineering job". The aerial warfare service branch had struggled to identify a for-profit corporation to develop the defense system, so MITRE was hired to serve as the system engineer. MITRE subsequently designed air defense systems for the U.S. and allies, improving aircraft and missile tracking as well as communication interception abilities. The company also helped design the Cheyenne Mountain Complex facility in Colorado operating the North American Air Defense system. In the 1970s, MITRE continued supporting military projects such as AWACS and the Joint Tactical Information Distribution System and "[helping] civil agencies develop information systems for transportation, medicine, law enforcement, space exploration and environmental cleanup."

MITRE has completed software engineering work for the Distributed Common Ground System and helped the North Atlantic Treaty Organization create intelligence, surveillance and reconnaissance (ISR) data standards. The company also worked with the Multi-Sensor Aerospace-Ground Joint ISR Interoperability Coalition to ensure proper formatting for ISR sensor data. In 2018, MITRE developed the "Deliver Uncompromised" strategy for the Department of Defense, proposing recommendations for supply chain security. MITRE and the Air Force Association's Mitchell Institute published a report in 2019 recommending improved technologies for the U.S. nuclear command, control and communications (NC3) network and warning that some of the system's early satellites are "vulnerable to electronic attacks and interference". The firm also published a government-mandated report with recommendations for the Air Force's inventory in 2030. The Department of Veterans Affairs hired MITRE to provide recommendation for implementation and program integration of the Forever GI Bill.

MITRE has also focused on the great power competition; in 2020, the company published a paper about 5G networks and competition between China and the U.S.

Airspace, Global Positioning System (GPS), and aerospace 
In addition to military work, MITRE's early projects included air traffic control improvements for the Federal Aviation Administration (FAA). During the 1980s, MITRE helped modernize the Air Force's airborne early warning and control system and improve the Milstar constellation of communications satellites. The company also worked on a major overhaul of the FAA's traffic control system as well as sensor technology for tracking stealth aircraft. In 1997, MITRE sponsored a research program related to Global Positioning System (GPS) adaptive nulling antennas. MITRE also provided global navigation satellite system signal generation equipment for testing at the United States Army's White Sands Missile Range. The Air Force Research Laboratory's geosynchronous satellite Navigation Technology Satellite-3 will use MITRE's Global Navigation Satellite System Test Architecture to "implement user equipment capability".

MITRE has worked on the traffic collision avoidance system of the Next Generation Air Transportation System (NextGen), a modernization project of the National Airspace System (NAS). MITRE's Integrated Demonstration and Experimentation for Aeronautics (IDEA) Lab has assessed the impact of new technologies for the FAA since 1992. In addition to air traffic management and aviation regulations, the group has worked on merging unmanned aerial vehicle operations into the NAS as well as defining how the system will function in 2035, a decade after the scheduled implementation of NextGen.

MITRE has explored the use of mobile devices for communicating instrument flight rules, specifically clearances at airports lacking Pre-Departure Clearance/Data Comm Clearance. The company's Pacer web application uses System Wide Information Management and Traffic Flow Management System data as well as airline and general aviation departure schedules to "improve the way that general aviation operators file for and obtain departure clearances".

MITRE has also completed air traffic control and safety work for the Civil Aviation Authority of Singapore (CAAS). The company's Singapore-based unit was hired by CAAS to consider how artificial intelligence, machine learning, and speech recognition could be used to improve air traffic management systems. Among MITRE's innovations was a "speech recognition prototype that will automate and shorten the transcription process during an aviation incident investigation".

MITRE and the Naval Research Laboratory developed the Frequency-scaled Ultra-wide Spectrum Element (FUSE) antenna to increase the data transfer speed between ground users and satellites. Meshbed, a CubeSat launched into orbit by the Indian Space Research Organisation's Polar Satellite Launch Vehicle in November 2019, will test the antenna's effectiveness. MITRE has received three patents for the antenna.

Cybersecurity and election integrity 
The MITRE ATT&CK framework, launched in 2015, has been described by Computer Weekly as "the free, globally accessible service that offers comprehensive and current cyber security threat information" to organizations, and by TechTarget as a "global knowledge base of threat activity, techniques and models". The framework has been used by the Cybersecurity and Infrastructure Security Agency and the FBI. Version 8.0 was released in 2020. According to a 2020 study published by the University of California, Berkeley and security software company McAfee, 80 percent of companies use the framework for cybersecurity.

The Structured Threat Information eXchange (STIX), described as a "machine-to-machine cyber threat information-sharing language", was developed by MITRE and the Department of Homeland Security. The program facilitates information sharing between industry, critical infrastructure operators and government in order to blunt cyberattacks" and allows participants to share data via the Trusted Automated eXchange of Indicator Information (TAXII). Program governance was granted to the global nonprofit consortium OASIS in 2015, and STIX 2.0 was approved in 2017.

In September 2020, the U.S. Air Force awarded a $463 million contract to continue work for the National Security Engineering Center, an FFRDC supporting the Department of Defense and Intelligence Community. The contract will provide cybersecurity, electronics, information technology, sensors, and systems engineering services in Bedford and McLean for one year. Microsoft and MITRE partnered on the open source Adversarial Machine Learning Threat Matrix in collaboration with IBM, Nvidia, and academic institutions. Launched in October 2020, the framework is "designed to organize and catalogue known techniques for attacks against machine-learning systems, to inform security analysts and provide them with strategies to detect, respond and remediate against threats".

In February 2020, MITRE launched SQUINT, a free app allowing election officials to report misinformation on social media; the app was being used by eleven U.S. states, as of October 2020. The company also established the National Election Security Lab, offering free risk assessments for voting systems.

Other projects include the Common Vulnerabilities and Exposures (CVE) database of vulnerabilities and exposures related to information security and the Common Weakness Enumeration (CWE) category system for software weaknesses and vulnerabilities.

Government innovation 
MITRE and the British startup company Simudyne partnered to convert an "agent-based" financial risk model of "asset fire-sales and investor flight from banks and funds into a commercial product". The new system is based on one MITRE had previously created for the Department of the Treasury. MITRE has also researched cloud computing policy, helped the U.S. federal government identify fraudulent comments intended to "spoof" public support for non-existent positions during the rulemaking process, and increased the Pennsylvania Department of Revenue's delinquent taxpayer compliance rate.

Health care 
In 1982, Mitre authored a proposal for the State Department called "Cannabis Eradication in Foreign Western Nations." In this proposal, a plan was outlined to eradicate cannabis in participating nations within 121 days, for $19 million. The report discussed the use and safety considerations of paraquat. The plan would have been to aerially dispense paraquat over marijuana crops. One safety concern was the food crops grown alongside the marijuana crops being contaminated. A study conducted on rats by Imperial Chemical Industries was cited in the report, and claimed low health risks for paraquat. The U.S. Public Health Service commented on this study saying that due to the present squamous metaplasia in the respiratory tracts of the rats that "This study should not be used to calculate the safe inhalation dose of paraquat in humans."

During the 1980s, MITRE worked on a digital radiological imaging project for MedStar Georgetown University Hospital and an upgrade to MEDLINE for the National Institutes of Health. Synthea, MITRE's open source synthetic data system, "mirrors real population information in terms of demographics, disease burden, vaccinations, medical visits and social determinants", and seeks to "mimic how each patient progresses from birth to death through modular representations of various diseases and conditions". MITRE's patient data set SyntheticMass, based on "fictional" Massachusetts residents, was formatted by Fast Healthcare Interoperability Resources and made available to developers via Google Cloud in 2019.

COVID-19  
In March 2020, during the COVID-19 pandemic, MITRE published a white paper claiming the number of confirmed and reported COVID-19 cases "significantly underrepresent the actual number of active domestic COVID-19 infections" in the United States. MITRE said the gap was because of "limited testing capability and the multi-day period of asymptomatic infectivity associated with the COVID-19 pathogen". MITRE managed the Coronavirus Commission on Safety and Quality in Nursing Homes, announced by the Donald Trump administration in June 2020, to "independently and comprehensively assess" responses to the pandemic and "offer actionable recommendations to inform future responses to infectious disease outbreaks within nursing homes".

The Centers for Disease Control and Prevention (CDC) funded a $16.5 million MITRE-led project to create an enduring open source tool called Sara Alert, for monitoring symptoms of Americans exposed to COVID-19. MITRE developed the free tool in collaboration with multiple national public health organizations as well as local and state health agencies. In April 2020, Sara Alert launched in Arkansas and was being tested in Danbury, Connecticut as well as the Northern Mariana Islands, with data being maintained by the Association of Public Health Laboratories. Sara Alert was being used in Idaho, Maine, Pennsylvania, and Virginia by the end of May, and Guam by October. Since January 2021, MITRE has co-lead a coalition known as the Vaccination Credential Initiative (VCI), which is composed of over 300 technology and healthcare organizations developing a technical standard for verifying vaccination and other clinical information.

Corporate governance

Leadership
Clair William Halligan, an electrical engineer, served as MITRE's first president until 1966, when he became chairman of the company's executive committee. He retired in 1968. John L. McLucas succeeded Halligan as president. Robert Everett served as president from 1969 to 1986. Subsequent holders of the president and chief executive officer (CEO) role included Charles S. Zraket (1986–1990), Barry Horowitz (1990–1996), Victor A. DeMarines (1996–2000), Martin C. Faga (2000–2006), and Alfred Grasso (2006–2017). Jason Providakes became the current president and CEO in 2017.

Jay Schnitzer serves as chief technology officer and chief medical officer. He is leading a national effort to combat COVID-19 on behalf of MITRE and 50 partner companies, health care providers, and researchers, as of March 2020. MITRE named Charles Clancy its first chief futurist in 2020 and restructured to create MITRE Labs.

Current trustees include Mike Rogers (chairman), George Campbell Jr., Lance Collins, Maury W. Bradsher, Sue Gordon, Yvette Meléndez, George Halvorson, Paul G. Kaminski, Adalio T. Sanchez, Cathy Minehan, John H. Noseworthy, Rodney E. Slater, and Jan E. Tighe.

Partnerships 
The Alliance for Clinical Trials in Oncology, American Society of Clinical Oncology, and MITRE partnered on the 'mCODE Initiative' to recommend data standards for cancer patients' electronic health records. MITRE supports the Homeland Security Experts Group, which has been described as "an independent, nonpartisan group of homeland security and counterterrorism experts that educates the public and government leaders, including the secretary of homeland security".

MITRE became a founding member of the Space Information Sharing and Analysis Center, a cybersecurity project for the space industry, in 2019. MITRE and partners such as Harvard Innovation Labs and MassChallenge launched Bridging Innovation in 2020 to connect government agencies and startup companies. MITRE is a member of the COVID-19 Healthcare Coalition, which is co-chaired by Jay Schnitzer. In June 2020, the coalition launched the COVID-19 Decision Support Dashboard, which uses public data to assess transmission trends and display color-coded indicators based on performance by jurisdiction. MITRE is also part of the Fight Is In Us coalition, a collaborative effort between advocates, companies, and government officials to promote plasma donation for patient treatment during the COVID-19 pandemic.

Challenges 
MITRE's Countering Unmanned Aircraft Systems Challenge in 2016 invited applicants to "demonstrate systems that detect and stop drones weighing less than five pounds that present a safety or security risk". The company's Unique Identification of Internet of Things (IoT) Devices Challenge tasked applicants with improving security for connected devices. In 2020, MITRE participated in the National Institute of Standards and Technology's Too Close for Too Long Challenge to "help evaluate and potentially improve upon that baseline Bluetooth performance for helping detect when smartphone users are standing too close to one another".

Locations 
In addition to the headquarter campuses in Bedford and McLean, MITRE has more than 60 other locations throughout the United States and around the world. In New Jersey, two offices house approximately 60 employees, as of September 2020. Up to 70 percent of employees may continue working remotely, even after restrictions associated with the COVID-19 pandemic have been lifted.

MITRE's data center in Bedford, originally built during the 1980s and known as the High Performance Computing Center since 2015, was retrofitted with a refrigerant-based cooling system, resulting in lower operating costs and a higher compute capacity. The company's McLean campus houses the Integrated Demonstration and Experimentation for Aeronautics (IDEA) Lab, as well as the Mobile Autonomous Systems Experimentation lab, which focuses on self-driving cars. MITRE's laboratory in Singapore, called Mitre Asia Pacific Singapore (MAPS) assesses and displays "various safety and air traffic concepts in preparation for the future".

Recognition
In June 2008, MITRE was presented with the Secretary of Defense Medal for Outstanding Public Service for "significant contributions in communications, command and control decision-making, intelligence, cyberspace, and warfighter field support, as well as research and development". In July 2008, MITRE was awarded the Air Force Association's Theodore Von Karman award for "the most outstanding contribution in the field of engineering and science". In July 2008, MITRE's Center for Advanced Aviation System Development (CAASD), as part of an ADS-B team of 26 public and private sector groups, was selected for the 2007 Collier Trophy for its efforts in conceptualizing, developing, and implementing a fundamental, so-called "cornerstone capability" for the future of the national airspace system.

In 2011, for the second time, MITRE's knowledge management successes have earned the corporation a North American Most Admired Knowledge Enterprises (MAKE) award, which recognizes organizations for exceptional knowledge management and knowledge sharing practices. In 2011 and 2012, InformationWeek named MITRE to its InformationWeek 500, an annual ranking of the nation's most innovative users of business technology. In 2013, MITRE was named a CSO40 Award winner by the International Data Group's CSO Magazine. The CSO40 Awards recognize 40 organizations for security projects and initiatives that demonstrate outstanding business value and thought leadership. In 2015, Forbes named MITRE one of America's Best Employers.

MITRE has been included on annual lists of several magazines. The Boston Globe has named MITRE to its "Top Places to Work" list for four years. Fortune included MITRE in its "100 Best Companies to Work For" for ten consecutive years. Computerworld included MITRE in its "100 Best Places to Work in IT" list, for eight consecutive years; the company was recognized again in 2016 and 2018–2020. Glassdoor has named MITRE one of the "50 Best Places to Work" for five consecutive years. In 2021, MITRE was included in CIO magazine's "CIO 100" list, which recognizes IT organizations "for driving digital business growth through technology innovation".

MITRE has also been included in The Washington Post lists of "Top Workplaces", ranking number 8 and number 10 in the large companies category in 2016 and 2017, respectively. Bloomberg Government ranked the company number 47 in 2018 and 2019 lists of top federal contractors. In 2019 and 2021, the magazine U.S. Black Engineer and Information Technology included MITRE in a list of "top supporters" of engineering programs at historically black colleges and universities. MITRE ranked number 38 in The Denver Post 2020 list of the "best midsize companies to work for" in Colorado.

References

External links

 Mitre at Market Visual

 
United States Department of Defense
Federally Funded Research and Development Centers
Non-profit organizations based in Massachusetts
Non-profit organizations based in McLean, Virginia
Bedford, Massachusetts
Organizations established in 1958
1958 establishments in Massachusetts